The Avelino Gomez Memorial Award is a Canadian thoroughbred horse racing honour given annually to a jockey who is Canadian-born, Canadian-raised, or a regular in the country for more than five years, who has made significant contributions to the sport. The honour is named for the late Cuban-born Canadian and American Hall of Fame jockey Avelino Gomez who died in 1980 of complications from injuries sustained in a racing accident.

Avelino Gomez Memorial Award honourees receive a replica of the life-size statue of Gomez sculpted by Siggy Puchta that stands at Woodbine Racetrack.

In 2004, Francine Villeneuve became the first female recipient of the award.

Award winners 

 2022 : Slade Callaghan
 2021 : Eurico Rosa da Silva
 2020 : no award given
 2019 : Frank Barroby
 2018 : Emma-Jayne Wilson
 2017 : Gary Boulanger
 2016 : Gary Stahlbaum
 2015 : Quincy Welch
 2014 : Patrick Husbands
 2013 : Mickey Walls
 2012 : Steven Bahen
 2011 : Emile Ramsammy
 2010 : Stewart Elliott

 2007 : George HoSang
 2006 : John LeBlanc
 2005 : Sam Krasner
 2004 : Francine Villeneuve
 2003 : Robert Landry
 2002 : Richard Dos Ramos
 2001 : Chris Loseth
 2000 : James McKnight
 1999 : David Clark
 1998 : Irwin Driedger
 1997 : Richard Grubb
 2009 : Robert King
 2008 : Jack Lauzon

 1996 : David A. Gall
 1995 : Don Seymour
 1994 : no award given 
 1993 : Larry Attard
 1992 : Robin Platts
 1991 : Hugo Dittfach
 1990 : Lloyd Duffy
 1989 : Jeffrey Fell
 1988 : Chris Rogers
 1987 : Don MacBeth
 1986 : Sandy Hawley
 1985 : Johnny Longden
 1984 : Ron Turcotte

References

External links 
 The 2008 Avelino Gomez Memorial Award at Fort Erie Racetrack
 The 2009 Avelino Gomez Memorial Award at The Bloodhorse.com

Canadian sports trophies and awards
Horse racing awards
Horse racing in Canada